Voitsberg is a small city in the district of Voitsberg in Styria, Austria, with a population of c. 9,700 . It grew upon the St. Margaret church at the Tregistbach river and was first mentioned in 1220 as Civitas. Remains of the Greisenegg palace and Obervoitsberg castle can be seen. Other objects of interest are its Cityhall Voitsberg, designed by architect Arik Brauer.

Transport
Voitsberg is connected by rail to Köflach and Styria's capital city Graz.

Twin towns
 San Martino Buon Albergo, Italy

References

Cities and towns in Voitsberg District